Roman Kejžar (born 11 February 1966 in Kranj) is a Slovenian long-distance and marathon runner. He is a three-time Olympian, and a 2004 national marathon champion. He also set both a national record and a personal best time of 2:11:50 at the 2000 Turin Marathon, earning him a spot on the Slovenian team for the Olympics.

At age thirty-four, Kejzar made his official debut for the 2000 Summer Olympics in Sydney, where he placed sixty-second out of a hundred runners in the men's marathon, with a time of 2:26:38, fourteen seconds behind Tanzania's Zebedayo Bayo. He displayed a stellar performance at the 2004 Summer Olympics in Athens, when he finished fifty-fourth in the marathon for the second time, posting his best Olympic career time of 2:23:34.

Eight years after competing in his first Olympics, Kejzar qualified for his third Slovenian team, as a 42-year-old, at the 2008 Summer Olympics in Beijing, by placing nineteenth and reaching an A-standard time of 2:17:26 from the 2007 Berlin Marathon. He successfully finished the race in sixty-seventh place by nine seconds behind Mexico's Francisco Bautista, with a time of 2:29:37.

References

External links

NBC 2008 Olympics profile

Slovenian male marathon runners
Living people
Olympic athletes of Slovenia
Athletes (track and field) at the 2000 Summer Olympics
Athletes (track and field) at the 2004 Summer Olympics
Athletes (track and field) at the 2008 Summer Olympics
Sportspeople from Kranj
1966 births
Slovenian male long-distance runners